John William Jackson Steele (30 July 1905 – 29 March 1990) was an English first-class cricketer. Steele was a right-handed batsman who bowled right-arm medium pace.

Steele first represented Hampshire while staying in Winchester as an army chaplain, having made a name playing for the Army cricket team. Steele made his first-class debut against Gloucestershire, a match in which he scored his highest first-class score of 44. During the same year Steele played for Hampshire against the touring Australians, who featured the great Don Bradman.

Steele would represent Hampshire in seventeen first-class matches until July 1939, with his final first-class match coming against Northamptonshire. Steele was a handy lower order batsman, scoring 406 runs at an average of 16.91. With his medium pace Steele took 57 wickets at an average of 26.64 with best bowling figures of 6-62.

Steele also represented the Army in two first-class matches against Oxford University in 1938 and Cambridge University in 1939.

With the onset of the Second World War first-class cricket was stopped, bringing an end to Steele's career.

External links
John Steele at Cricinfo
John Steele at CricketArchive
Matches and detailed statistics for John Steele

1905 births
1990 deaths
Cricketers from Cheshire
Sportspeople from Crewe
English cricketers
Hampshire cricketers
British Army cricketers
Royal Army Chaplains' Department officers
English military chaplains
20th-century British Army personnel